Al ‘Āmrāt or Al Amirat is a city in Muscat, in northeastern Oman.

Al Amarat is the fifth (out of six) most populated province in the Muscat Governorate after Muscat itself, As Seeb, Bawshar and Muttrah.

Al Amarat is categorized as a Wilayat with its own Wali (Mayor) office, municipality, police station, and government offices.

Location and Surrounding states 
Al Amirat is located in the middle of Muscat Governate, surrounding it Muttrah from the north, and Bawshar from the west, and Muscat (the state) from the east, and Dema Wa Thaieen from the south west.

History landmarks in Al Amirat 
The state merges the past and present as there are existing houses and Souqs that are made from Omani Sarooj which is proved to be standing strong until now. There are also a couple of forts and defensive towers scattered across the state. In addition to that, there is also the historical AlKhufaiji Mosque, which is believed to be built in the reign of Sayed Hilal Bin Ahmed AlBusaidi (The eldest son of Ahmed bin Said, the first of the Al Said Dynasty) which is circa 1750. The mosque was built from cement and gravel, and it is located at a top of a hill, there is a long staircase leading to the mosque made from Gypsum.

Al Amirat People 
Al Amirat people were not different from other Omanis, the majority of people worked in farming and livestock caring, the locals excel in pottery and have their unique artistic touches in their craft. AlSirren Nature reserve is also located in the state, which mainly preserves the life of Capra and Gazelle.

Al Amirat Mountain View point 
Perhaps the most famous (Or infamous if you're driving) thing about Al Amirat, is the way there, if you went from Bawshar way, the way has many sharp turns and constantly going upwards and downwards, which makes it a headache to even thinking about driving that way, but to compensate that, the view from the top of the mountain is unworldly.

References

Populated places in the Muscat Governorate